The following highways are numbered 436:

Canada
Newfoundland and Labrador Route 436

Japan
 Japan National Route 436

United States
  Florida State Road 436
  Louisiana Highway 436
  Louisiana Highway 436-1
  Maryland Route 436
  New York State Route 436
 New York State Route 436 (former)
  Pennsylvania Route 436
  Puerto Rico Highway 436
  Wyoming Highway 436